Toolse is a village in Haljala Parish, Lääne-Viru County, in northeastern Estonia.

Toolse Castle
Toolse castle was a crusader castle belonging to the Teutonic Order. It was completed in 1471. At one point of time, it was reportedly the northernmost outpost of the Holy Roman Empire.

Today only ruins remain. A conservation and archaeological survey scheme has been carried out at the site since 2006.

See also
Toolse River
List of castles in Estonia

References

Villages in Lääne-Viru County
Castles of the Teutonic Knights